Route 122 is a short highway in central Missouri.  Its eastern terminus is at Route 41 in Fairville (the only town on the route), which is halfway between Miami and Marshall.  The western terminus is at Van Meter State Park.  The total length of the highway is about five miles (8 km).

Route description
Route 122 begins within Van Meter State Park in Saline County, where the road continues north as VM Pinnacle Drive. From the western terminus, the route heads south as a two-lane undivided road, passing through wooded areas of the state park. The road leaves Van Meter State Park and enters agricultural areas. Route 122 turns to the east and continues to its eastern terminus at Route 41. Past this intersection, the road continues east as Route NN.

Major intersections

References

122
Transportation in Saline County, Missouri